Tönnies is a surname. Notable people with the surname include:

 Ferdinand Tönnies (1855–1936), German sociologist
 Gustav Tönnies (1814 – 1886), Swedish carpenter, architect and industrialist
Johann Friedrich Tönnies (1662 – 1736), German merchant and banker
 Michael Tönnies (born 1959), German football player
 Rudolf Tönnies (1869 – 1929), Austro-Hungarian and Yugoslav architect and politician
Thorsten Tönnies (born 1991), German footballer
 Clemens Tönnies (born 1956), German billionaire and main shareholder of Tönnies Holding

Companies
Tönnies Holding, a German company in the meat industry

See also

Tonnie
Heinrich Tønnies